"Strange Kind of Woman" is a song by British rock band Deep Purple that was originally released as a follow-up single after "Black Night" in early 1971. The song also became a hit, peaking at No. 8 on the UK chart and Germany, and No. 1 in Denmark. The 1996 remix by Roger Glover later appeared on the re-release of the band's 1971 album Fireball, while the original version can be found on various Deep Purple compilations. Although not part of the Fireball recording sessions, "Strange Kind of Woman" was included on the US and Canadian editions of the album, in lieu of the track "Demon's Eye" on the UK edition.

The B-side song, "I'm Alone", was later released on The Deep Purple Singles A's and B's as well as on the 25th anniversary reissue of Fireball.

History 
The song was originally called "Prostitute". Vocalist Ian Gillan introduced the song on Deep Purple in Concert: "It was about a friend of ours who got mixed up with a very evil woman and it was a sad story. They got married in the end. And a few days after they got married, the lady died." In Wordographys section Gillan gives a slightly different version of the song's history:

When Deep Purple performed the song live, Gillan and guitarist Ritchie Blackmore would play a guitar-vocal duel in the middle. This would always end with an extremely long, high-pitched scream from Gillan before the band returned to playing the original song. An example can be heard on the live album, Made in Japan, recorded in 1972.

Personnel
 Ian Gillan – vocals
 Ritchie Blackmore – guitars
 Roger Glover – bass
 Jon Lord – keyboards
 Ian Paice – drums

References

Deep Purple songs
1971 songs
Songs written by Ian Gillan
Songs written by Roger Glover
Songs written by Ritchie Blackmore
Songs written by Jon Lord
Songs written by Ian Paice
Warner Records singles
Harvest Records singles
1971 singles
Songs about prostitutes